1995 GJ might be a trans-Neptunian object and/or high-inclination cubewano from the Kuiper belt in the outermost region of the Solar System, and based on the calculated distance and brightness is assumed to be approximately  in diameter. It is a lost minor planet that has only been observed six times on the nights of 3–4 April 1995, by David Jewitt and Jun Chen at the Mauna Kea Observatory, Hawaii, using the UH88 telescope, and has not been observed ever since.

Orbit 

The nominal orbit of 1995 GJ suggests it orbits the Sun at a distance of 39–46 AU once every 281 years with an assumed eccentricity of 0.09 and an inclination of 23° with respect to the ecliptic. But 1995 GJ has the highest possible orbital uncertainty and thus very large uncertainties in the orbital elements. With only a 1-day observation arc, the orbit is so poorly constrained as to be almost worthless.

Otherwise known for their low inclinations, this cubewano may be the first of its kind to have an inclination greater than 20°. But as a one-night stand with only 6 observations, 1995 GJ has numerous orbits that fit the uncertainties in the very small dataset. 1995 GJ could be a trans-Neptunian object, a centaur, or a much closer main belt asteroid 100 times smaller in diameter. As an example,  (when it had a one-day observation arc) was thought to be a potential trans-Neptunian dwarf planet, but is now known to be a small main belt asteroid.

Using the nominal orbit with the assumed eccentricity, 1995 GJ may come to opposition around mid March of each year at an apparent magnitude of 22.9.

, the uncertainty in the object's distance from the Sun is an unrealistic ±.

References

External links 
 List Of Transneptunian Objects, Minor Planet Center
 

Kuiper belt objects
Minor planet object articles (unnumbered)
Lost minor planets
19950403